The 1985–86 North West Counties Football League was the fourth in the history of the North West Counties Football League, a football competition in England. Teams were divided into three divisions.

Division One

Division One featured 2 new teams:

 Clitheroe promoted as champions from Division Two
 Irlam Town promoted as runners-up from Division Two

League table

Division Two

Division Two featured 3 new teams:

 Lancaster City, relegated from Division One
 Kirkby Town promoted as champions from Division Three
 Colwyn Bay promoted as runners-up from Division Three

League table

Division Three

Oldham Dew changed their name to Oldham Town

Division Three featured 2 new teams:

 Padiham, relegated from Division Two
 Huyton Town

League table

Promotion and relegation

Division One
Prescot Cables and Formby were relegated to Division Two.

Division two
Division Two champions Kirkby Town and second placed Rossendale United were promoted to Division One while Ford Motors and Nantwich Town were relegated to Division Three.

Division Three
Division Three champions Blackpool Mechanics and second placed Oldham Town were promoted to Division Two while Bolton ST, Prestwich Heys, Huyton Town and Ashton Athletic left the League at the end of the season and were replaced by newly admitted Flixton and Ashton Town.

External links 
 North West Counties Football League Tables at RSSSF

North West Counties Football League seasons
7